The Allen-Bowden School District is a school district based in Tulsa, Oklahoma United States. It serves preschool through 8th Grade students at an Early Childhood Center (PK-3), a Middle School (4-5), and a Junior High (6-8).

See also
List of school districts in Oklahoma

References

External links
 Allen-Bowden Overview

School districts in Oklahoma
Education in Tulsa County, Oklahoma